Andy D'Agorne is a Green politician, who has represented Fishergate Ward for the Green Party of England and Wales since being elected as one of the first Green councillors for York, England in 2003.  After the 2019 City of York Council election, the Liberal Democrats and the Green Party announced that they had agreed to run City of York Council in a new 'progressive partnership' coalition, with Green Group leader D'Agorne assuming the role of Deputy Leader of the Council and Executive Member for Transport while Liberal Democrat leader Keith Aspden was elected as Leader of the Council.

General elections 
In the 1997 United Kingdom general election, D'Agorne stood as the Green Party candidate for the Sheffield Central constituency. He lost clearly against Labour MP Richard Caborn, getting 954 votes and achieving 2.6% of the overall vote share.

In the 2017 United Kingdom general election, D'Agorne was selected as Green party parliamentary candidate for the York Central constituency. Controversially, he later withdrew his candidacy to ensure not to split the vote on the left. Short of endorsing Labour candidate Rachael Maskell, he indicated that her Green’s policies were closer to his than any of the alternatives.

European elections 
D'Agorne stood as a Green Party list candidate for Yorkshire and the Humber EU constituency in the 1999 European Parliament election in the United Kingdom.

City of York Council elections 
D'Agorne was first elected to City of York Council as one of two Green councillors for the Fishergate ward at the 2003 City of York Council election. He got 1,093 votes (25.6%) ahead of fellow Green Party candidate Mark Hill. It was the first time that Green councillors were elected to City of York Council, winning the ward from the Labour Party.

At the 2007 City of York Council election, D'Agorne was reelected as one of two Green councillors for the Fishergate ward with 1,308 votes (25.0%) ahead of fellow Green Party candidate Dave Taylor. He continued to serve as councillor for Fishergate ward after winning a majority at the 2011 City of York Council election with 1,632 votes (29,5%), at the 2015 City of York Council election with 2,241 votes (28,0%) and with 1,553 votes (32,2%) at the 2019 City of York Council election.

Liberal Democrats / Green Administration 
Following the 2019 City of York Council election, the Liberal Democrats gained the most councillors on City of York Council, but remained three short of the 24 seats needed to gain overall control. Cllr D'Agorne first proposed a three-party coalition with Labour and the Liberal Democrats, after the Green Party held its four council seats at the election. Later York’s Greens and Lib Dems secured a deal to run the council together in a joint administration with D'Agorne assuming the role of Deputy Leader of the Council and Executive Member for Transport. Afterwards, York's Labour Party accused Green Group Leader D’Agorne of dishonesty as he supposedly didn’t provide any options to Green party members to work with Labour in a two or three-party Coalition, citing leaked minutes of internal Green Party’s discussion on power-sharing.

The Groves traffic ban 
As Executive Member for Transport, Cllr D'Agorne ordered a controversial traffic ban in The Groves district of York under the government's low traffic neighbourhood scheme, using government emergency funding that aims to promote cycling and walking during the COVID19 pandemic. Minor changes were made to the traffic scheme after complaints were made that the scheme was blocking emergency vehicles. While opponents of the scheme claim that the scheme causes stress and inconveniences for local residents, Cllr D'Agorne stated that the development of the scheme started before the LibDem-Green administration got in place and local residents had been consulted by council officers and are supportive of the trial. The plans were approved on a temporary basis for 18 months, but D'Agorne indicated that the experimental trail would eventually become permanent.

Bishopthorpe Road closure 
Cllr D'Agorne introduced emergency traffic measures during the Coronavirus pandemic on Bishopthorpe Road earlier in 2020, comprising a southbound closure of the street. The closure caused some opposition, with a petition supporting re-opening receiving 1,600 signatures, but was supported by the local Labour and Green ward councillors. The temporary order expired on 4 August 2020. The council said: “Whilst the restriction helped with meeting the objectives for social distancing, a gradual increase in traffic has caused a number of local issues, including increased congestion and unofficial diversions through side streets."

Ring road dualling 
D'Agorne came into conflict with his own party on the York outer ring road dualling plans, a project that York Green Party opposed for years and claimed cannot be justified under the council's climate policies. As the responsible executive member of the Lib Dem/Green administration, D'Agorne committed himself to a joint approach with the Liberal Democrats, who support the plans, to take the project forward and secure the necessary funding from the Department for Transport and the West Yorkshire Combined Authority.

References

External links
Andy D’Agorne – York Green Party
Councillor details - Councillor Andy D'Agorne
Lib Dems and the Green Party join forces to run City of York Council

Year of birth missing (living people)
Living people
Green Party of England and Wales politicians
Politicians from Sheffield